Peter Werenfels (May 20, 1627 – May 23, 1703) was a Swiss theologian, professor at the University of Basel and antistes of the Basel church. He served as the doctoral advisor of prominent mathematician Jacob Bernoulli.

References

1623 births
1703 deaths
Swiss Calvinist and Reformed theologians
17th-century Calvinist and Reformed theologians
18th-century Calvinist and Reformed theologians
People from Basel-Stadt